Margarita Nolasco Santiago is a Puerto Rican politician, senator, and former Mayor of Coamo. She has been a member of the Senate of Puerto Rico since 2004.

Early years and studies
Margarita Nolasco obtained her bachelor's degree from the Pontifical Catholic University of Puerto Rico, and her master's degree from State University of New York, both in Education with a Major in Mathematics. She then completed her Doctorate in Education with a Major in Curriculum from the Interamerican University of Puerto Rico.

Professional career

After receiving her bachelor's degree, Nolasco worked for the Puerto Rico Department of Education in Barranquitas High School. After finishing her master's degree, she worked as a mathematics teacher at the Interamerican University of Puerto Rico in Barranquitas. Two years later, she was appointed as Coordinator of Academic Affairs of the same institution.

After some time, she transferred to the Interamerican University of San Germán where she worked as Director of the General Education Program. She then transferred to the Ponce Campus where she worked as Dean of Academic Affairs.

She is co-author of two books in mathematics with McGraw-Hill.

Political career

Nolasco began her political career in 1996, when she was elected as Mayor of Coamo. She ran again in the 2000 elections, but lost to the candidate of the Popular Democratic Party.

In 2004, she was elected to the Senate of Puerto Rico for the District of Guayama. She became the Majority Whip of her party, and eventually the Majority Speaker. During that term, she presided the Commission of Superior Education, among others.

For the 2008 general elections, Nolasco ran for Senator at-large after winning a slot at the PNP primaries. She was elected and appointed as President pro tempore by President Thomas Rivera Schatz.

Personal life

Nolasco has a son: Angel Miguel Cruz Nolasco, born in 1979. She also has three grandchildren: Clarymar, Angélica Cristina, and Angel Miguel.

See also

Senate of Puerto Rico

|-

|-

References

External links
Hon. Margarita Nolasco on SenadoPR

Members of the Senate of Puerto Rico
Interamerican University of Puerto Rico alumni
Living people
People from Coamo, Puerto Rico
Mayors of places in Puerto Rico
New Progressive Party (Puerto Rico) politicians
Presidents pro tempore of the Senate of Puerto Rico
Democratic Party (Puerto Rico) politicians
Puerto Rican women in politics
State University of New York alumni
20th-century American women politicians
20th-century American politicians
21st-century American women politicians
21st-century American politicians
Women mayors of places in Puerto Rico
Year of birth missing (living people)